Carlos Alberto Macedo (born 2 September 1965) is an actor. He is a member of the professional Portuguese theater company KlássiKus.  Macedo has appeared in a variety of media, from TV series, films, and animated movies to theatre productions.  Most notably, he has lent his voice to many well-known animated characters in Portuguese translations of popular cartoons, including Diego Vega/Zorro in A Lenda de Zorro (The Legend of Zorro) and Kenshin Himura in Samurai X.

Filmography

Animated television series
Doug, as Doug
Eu Sou o Weasel (I Am Weasel), as The Red Guy
A Lenda de Zorro (The Legend of Zorro), as Diego Vega/Zorro
Samurai X, as Rurouni Kenshin
Tweenies - os amigos animais

Animated films
Um porquinho chamado Babe (Babe)
Toy Story – Os Rivais (Toy Story)
Anastásia (Anastasia)
Uma Vida de Insecto (A Bug's Life)
Toy Story 2
Shrek
José, o Rei dos Sonhos (Joseph, King of the Dreams)
A Floresta Mágica (The Magic Forest)
A Dama e o Vagabundo (Lady and the Tramp)
A Dama e o Vagabundo 2 (Lady and the Tramp II: Scamp's Adventure)
101 Dálmatas (One Hundred and One Dalmatians)
101 Dálmatas II (101 Dalmatians II: Patch's London Adventure)
El Cid – A Lenda (The Legend of the Cid)
Back to Gaya – Pequenos Heróis (Back to Gaya)
Valiant – Os Bravos do Pombal (Valiant)
O Franjinhas e o Carrossel Mágico (The Magic Roundabout)
Bambi 2: o Grande Príncipe da Floresta (Bambi II)

References

External links

Portuguese male film actors
Portuguese male television actors
Portuguese male voice actors
1965 births
Living people